Lark Pien (born c. 1972) is an American cartoonist who has created the minicomics Stories from the Ward, Mr. Boombha, and Long Tail Kitty, the last of which won her the Friends of Lulu Kimberly Yale Award for Best New Talent in 2004.

Pien earned her Bachelor of Architecture in 1995 from California Polytechnic State University. She began making comics in 1997.

Bibliography

Picture Books 
 Long Tail Kitty 
 Long Tail Kitty, Come Out and Play
 Mr. Elephanter

Work as Colorist 
Pien is the colorist for the following books:
 American Born Chinese (author: Gene Luen Yang, publisher: First Second Books)
 Boxers & Saints (author: Gene Luen Yang, publisher: First Second Books)
 Sunny Side Up (authors: Jennifer and Matthew Holm, publisher: Graphix/Scholastic)
 Dragon Hoops (author: Gene Luen Yang, publisher: First Second Books)
Swing It, Sunny (authors: Jennifer and Matthew Holm, publisher: Graphix/Scholastic)
Sunny Rolls the Dice (authors: Jennifer and Matthew Holm, publisher: Graphix/Scholastic)
Sunny Makes a Splash (authors: Jennifer and Matthew Holm, publisher: Graphix/Scholastic)
Turtle in Paradise (authors: Jennifer L. Holm and Savanna Ganucheau, publisher: Random House Graphic)
Stargazing (author: Jen Wang, publisher: First Second Books)
Diana: Princess of the Amazons (authors: Shannon and Dean Hale, publisher: DC)
Avatar: The Last Airbender - The Lost Adventures and Team Avatar Tales Library Edition (author: Gene Yang, pub. Dark Horse Comics)

Anthologies 

Hello Kitty, Hello 40: a 40th Anniversary Tribute (pub VIZ Media)
Mameshiba: We Could Be Heroes graphic novel (pub VIZ Media)
Comics Squad #3: Detention! (pub Random House Books for Young Readers)
"The Story of Binny" Flight Volume 4 (2007) 
 "Game Daze" The Girls Guide to Guys' Stuff (2005)
 "Paragon" Scheherazade (2005)
 "Timshel" Blood Orange #4 (2004)
 "Demoniac Pacheco" Orchid (2002)

Minicomics 

 Immortal Chicken: Change (2019)
Immortal Chicken: Practice, Practice (2019)
Immortal Chicken: Relax, Relax (2019)
You Are, I Am - Magic (2009)
 Small Destructions (2008)
 Brave Mr. Elephanter (2007)
 Blomp!(2006)
 Long Tail Kitty - Graveyard Shift (2006)
 Long Tail Kitty - Full Moon Night (2004)
 Eat With Me, Long Tail Kitty cookbook (2003)
 Long Tail Kitty - Outer Space! (2002)
 Long Tail Kitty - XOXO (2002)
 Long Tail Kitty - Heaven (2001)
 Mr. Boombha Goes for a Walk (2001)
 Stories from the Ward, vols 1-4 (1997–2002)

Magazines 

 Illustoria Magazine (ed Elizabeth Haidle, pub McSweeney's)
 Studygroup Magazine #4 (ed Zack Soto)
 Nickelodeon Magazine (ed Chris Duffy)
 Vision Quest comics gazette (ed Tim Goodyear)

Murals 

 Sunstreet Breads in Minneapolis, MN
 Ronald McDonald House in Palo Alto, CA (with Butler Armsden Architects)

Web 

 Long Tail Kitty on sundayhaha.com (2020- )
 Immortal Chicken on Popula.com (2018)

Exhibitions 
 2015 - MOMENTUM: An Experiment in the Unexpected, "intervention" installation - San Jose Museum of Art, San Jose
 2009 - I Love You a Little gallery show - Studio Gallery, San Francisco
 2007/8 - I Am 10 exhibition - Cartoon Art Museum, San Francisco
 2007 - Small Destructions installation - Cartoon Art Museum, San Francisco
 2002 - She Draws Comics exhibition - Secession Gallery, Vienna
 2001 - 355 Days installation - Atlas(t) at Galería de la Raza, San Francisco

Awards 
 2004 — Friends of Lulu Kim Yale - Best New Talent
 2007 — Harvey Award for color work on American Born Chinese (written and drawn by Gene Luen Yang, published by First Second Books)(2006)
2021 — Recipient of Koyama Provides microgrant

References

 Okinaka, Bobby. "Pulp Representation," Asia Pacific Arts (Aug. 11, 2003).
Pay, Geoffrey. "Beyond Superheroes: Independent APA cartoonists featured in Small Press Spotlight," Asian Week (Mar. 21, 2003).

External links

Author page at Candlewick Press
Pien page at Lambiek.net's Comiclopedia

Alternative cartoonists
American architects
American women cartoonists
American female comics artists
Artists from San Francisco
Harvey Award winners for Best Colorist
Living people
1970s births
California Polytechnic State University alumni
American cartoonists